Carno is a wind farm of 68 turbines which started operation in October 1996.

Carno currently has the largest production capacity in Wales.

Specification
Originally consisting of 56 wind turbines each of 600 kilowatts (kW) maximum output, the combined maximum power of 33.6 megawatts (MW) made Carno the largest Wind Farm in Europe at the time of its construction. The total project cost was approximately £26 million.

Information:
Number of turbines: 56 (extended to 68 with Carno 2 in 2008)
Turbine manufacturer: Bonus Energy A/S, Denmark
Turbine rating: 600 kW.
Combined maximum power: 33.6MW
Tower height to hub: 
Annual production: 90 million units
Wildlife information: 37 species of birds. 512 species of insects & spiders, including one Red Data Book entry, the nationally scarce Trechus rivularis ground beetle.
Archaeological features: Bronze Age cairns, standing stones and a possible Roman road crossing from east to west.

Public footpaths cross the site and are waymarked on Ordnance Survey maps.

Gallery

See also

Wind power in the United Kingdom
npower UK

References

External links

Renewable Energy Sites in Wales
npower

Wind farms in Wales
Buildings and structures in Powys